Cynthia Becker Mello (born February 26, 1957) is a former Georgia Superior Court Judge on the DeKalb Superior Court, Stone Mountain Judicial Circuit, from 2000 until March 1, 2015. She presided over several high-profile cases, including the criminal trial of former Sheriff Sidney Dorsey and the release of exonerated Clarence Harrison.

Career
DeKalb County Drug Court, Tracks 1 & 2 - Presiding Judge
Judge of DeKalb County Superior Court (August 2000 – March 2015)
Trial lawyer and partner for Chambers, Mabry (1988 – 2000)

Education
University of Central Florida, Bachelor's degree in Finance
1987- Juris Doctor from Georgia State University College of Law

Controversy
Becker announced her resignation from the DeKalb County Superior Court in November, 2014, citing her engagement to be married, under the cloud of a Georgia Judicial Qualification Commission investigation into her handling of a case where she rejected a witness' testimony in a public corruption case.

In August, 2015, a Cobb County, Georgia grand jury indicted Becker on charges that she lied to the state judicial watchdog agency about her handling of that case. The charges were dismissed a few days later and the prosecutor was scolded for seeking the indictment.

Acclamations
Master, Bleckley Inn of Court, Georgia State University College of Law
Board of Visitors, GSU College of Law
2006 Member of Judicial Workload Assessment Committee and was appointed by Chief Justice Sears
Council of Superior Court Judges of Georgia - Treatment and Accountability Courts Committee and has also chaired on Public Outreach; Court Security  for the 4th Judicial Administrative District, Pattern Jury Instruction Committee, Uniform Rules Committee, the Executive Planning Team, and Special Committee on Other Courts
2007 Transition into Law Practice Program Mentor
Judicial Outreach - “Challenges of Being a Single Parent”; Mock Trials for elementary and middle school students
Frequent Presenter at professional seminars for Judges, Lawyers, and other legal professionals focusing on: legal ethics, professionalism and implementation and expansion of Accountability and Treatment Courts
2006 Named Law Dragon as one of the leading Judges in the Country
2005 Decatur Rotary Past President, former Vice President of DeKalb Library Foundation, Class of Leadership DeKalb; member of the Southern Center for International Studies
Professional Affiliations  include: DeKalb Bar Association, DeKalb Lawyers’ Association, Atlanta Bar Association - Judicial Section, President Elect, the Georgia Bar Association, the American Bar Association - Judicial Branch, and the National Association of Women Judges

References

1957 births
Living people
Georgia (U.S. state) state court judges
Georgia State University College of Law alumni
American women judges
21st-century American women